Giovanna Ángela Roa Cadín (born 20 November 1986) is a Chilean politician who was elected as a member of the Chilean Constitutional Convention.

References

External links
 BCN Profile

1986 births
Living people
21st-century Chilean politicians
Democratic Revolution politicians
Members of the Chilean Constitutional Convention
21st-century Chilean women politicians
Pontifical Catholic University of Chile alumni